Zvi Henryk Zimmerman (born 2 January 1913, died 10 June 2006) was a Zionist activist, jurist, and Israeli politician. He is also known for his cooperation with Henryk Sławik to save Jews during the Holocaust.

Biography
Zimmerman was born in 1913 in Skala-Podilska in Austria-Hungary (today in Ukraine), the son of Benjamin (Alter) Zimmerman and Zlata Pessia (Babe) Bitterman. He attended a secular high school and studied law at the Jagiellonian University. At the age of thirteen he became a devoted Zionist. He was a member of the Youth Movement of the General Zionists, Chairman of Kedima (the Zionist Student Union in Kraków) and Deputy Chairman of Kedima's national organization, and Deputy Chairman of the Zionist University Graduates.

He spent most of the war in the Kraków Ghetto. In the spring of 1943, after the ghetto was liquidated, he was taken to the Plaszow camp. He escaped and made his way to Budapest in October 1943. There, he met Dr. Henryk Sławik, the leader of the Polish Civic Committee for Relief for Refugees. The Polish government in exile (based in London) authorized the cooperation, which was possible thanks to the help of the Hungarian authorities - including Dr. József Antall Sr. (the father of future prime minister of Hungary József Antall), the head of Department IX of the Ministry of Interior Affairs (responsible for refugees of all nations), and Countess Szapary. Sławik provided Zimmerman a stamp with which he confirmed documents and forms the refugees had to fill out and then submitted them to Sławik. Along with the official stamp of the Polish Civic Committee, this signature on an official form enabled Polish Jews to obtain "Aryan" passports. About 14,000 Jews were thus saved.

In 1944, he immigrated to Palestine. From 1951 to 1959 he was a member of the Haifa City Council. In 1959, he was elected to the Fourth Knesset for the General Zionists (which later merged into the Liberal Party), and was a member of the Internal Affairs and House Committees. He was re-elected to the next three Knessets for Gahal and served on the Labor-Welfare and Finance Committees. In the Seventh Knesset he was Deputy Speaker of the Knesset. In 1978, he ran for mayor of Haifa, placing third with 17.20% of the vote. From 1983 to 1986 he served as Israel's ambassador to New Zealand. In 1961 he testified as a witness in the trial of Adolf Eichmann.

After his term in Wellington ended, he returned to Israel. Following the fall of the Iron Curtain, he decided to visit Poland and Hungary in order to pay back his debt to Sławik and Antall. he found out that Sławik was tortured, and killed by the Nazis. Sławik never told the Germans about his cooperation with Antall, who died in 1974. He published an announcement on the Cracow Przekrój weekly and has thus contacted Sławik's daughter. Thanks to Zimmerman's efforts, Sławik was awarded the Righteous Among the Nations title by Yad Vashem in 1992.

Zimmerman died on 10 June 2006.

Bibliography

References

External links

1913 births
2006 deaths
Jagiellonian University alumni
Polish emigrants to Mandatory Palestine
Ambassadors of Israel to New Zealand
General Zionists politicians
Liberal Party (Israel) politicians
Gahal politicians
Members of the 4th Knesset (1959–1961)
Members of the 5th Knesset (1961–1965)
Members of the 6th Knesset (1965–1969)
Members of the 7th Knesset (1969–1974)
Deputy Speakers of the Knesset
20th-century Israeli lawyers